George Forest Alexander (April 10, 1882 – May 16, 1948) was a judge of the United States territorial court for the Alaska Territory from 1933 to 1947.  He was born in Gallatin, Missouri the son of future Secretary of Commerce Joshua W. Alexander. He was in private practice in Portland, Oregon for over 20 years before being appointed to the bench in Alaska.  Alexander died in Portland, Oregon.

References

1882 births
1948 deaths
Alaska Territory judges
Burials at River View Cemetery (Portland, Oregon)
People from Daviess County, Missouri
Lawyers from Portland, Oregon
People from Juneau, Alaska
20th-century American judges
20th-century American lawyers